Labicymbium otti is a species of sheet weaver found in Brazil. It was described by Rodrigues in 2008.

References

Linyphiidae
Spiders described in 2008
Spiders of Brazil